CBAF-FM-5 is a French-language public radio station located in Halifax, Nova Scotia. It is part of the Ici Radio-Canada Première Network.

Owned and operated by the Canadian Broadcasting Corporation, it broadcasts at 92.3 MHz with an effective radiated power of 91,000 watts, using horizontal polarization. It is a Class C station using a non-directional antenna. The broadcast tower is located on Washmill Lake Drive in Clayton Park. The studios and offices are located on Chebucto Road in Halifax. The station also serves as the Première outlet for the Island of Newfoundland, by way of two repeaters.

Programming
The station has an ad-free news/talk format and is part of the Ici Radio-Canada Première network, which operates across Canada. Like all Première stations, but unlike most FM stations, it broadcasts in mono.

The station produces a morning drive time show (Le Réveil, Monday to Friday from 6 to 9 a.m.) and a Saturday morning fill-in show (Ça se passe ICI from 11 a.m. to 12 p.m.). An afternoon drive time program, L'heure de pointe Acadie comes from CBAF-FM Moncton, which also airs on CBAF-FM-15 in Charlottetown, Prince Edward Island.

History
The station signed on in 1979 as a rebroadcaster of CBAF 1300 in Moncton. In 1987, it became a separate station, despite retaining a rebroadcaster-like call sign.

CBAF-FM-5 was originally identified as CBAF-19-FM. The call sign change took effect on September 1, 1989.
At that time, the old 1300 signal of CBAF was shut down.

Transmitters

References

External links
Ici Radio-Canada Première

 (full list)

BAF
BAF
BAF
BAF
Radio stations established in 1979
1979 establishments in Nova Scotia